Rumeshika Kumari Ratnayake (born 27 June 1996) is a Sri Lankan sprint athlete specialising in the 100 and 200 meters events. She is the current fastest South Asian woman over 100 m, winning the gold at 2016 South Asian Games. She won the Bronze in the 200 m at the same games.

Rathnayake's personal best time of 23.40 in the 200 m and won the Silver at the 2017 Asian Athletics Championships.

Personal life
Rathnayake was born in Kegalle, Sri Lanka and attended to St. Joseph Balika Vidyalaya.

References

1996 births
Living people
Sri Lankan female sprinters
Athletes (track and field) at the 2018 Commonwealth Games
Athletes (track and field) at the 2018 Asian Games
South Asian Games gold medalists for Sri Lanka
South Asian Games bronze medalists for Sri Lanka
Asian Games competitors for Sri Lanka
South Asian Games medalists in athletics
Commonwealth Games competitors for Sri Lanka
20th-century Sri Lankan women
21st-century Sri Lankan women